Andrei Vladimirovich Uvarov (born 14 April 1971) is a former Russian football player.

External links
 

1971 births
People from Rostov Oblast
Living people
Soviet footballers
FC SKA Rostov-on-Don players
Russian footballers
PFC Krylia Sovetov Samara players
Russian Premier League players
Association football defenders
FC Taganrog players
Sportspeople from Rostov Oblast